Giorgio Ariani (26 May 1941 – 5 March 2016) was an Italian stand-up comedian, actor and voice actor.

Life and career 
Born in Ferrara, Ariani grew up in Florence and started his career as a comedian in regional cabaret clubs. He became first known thanks to the participation to several RAI variety shows such as Supersera and Ci pensiamo lunedì. He was also active in films, particularly in the early 1980s. 

In his late years Ariani directed a drama school in Campi Bisenzio. He died, aged 74, after a long illness. He was married and had three children.

References

External links  

 
 

Actors from Ferrara
1941 births  
2016 deaths  
Italian male stage actors
Italian male film actors
Italian male comedians
Italian male voice actors
20th-century Italian male actors
20th-century Italian comedians
21st-century Italian male actors
21st-century Italian comedians